The Long Rope may refer to:

Films
The Long Rope (1953 film), British crime drama directed by Wolf Rilla; original title The Large Rope
The Long Rope (1961 film), American western directed by William Witney

Television and radio
"The Long Rope", a 1949 episode of American radio series The Adventures of Philip Marlowe 
"The Long Rope", a 1960 episode of American TV western Cheyenne